Vikram Kumar Doraiswami is the High Commissioner of India to the United Kingdom. Prior to this appointment, he was the Indian High Commissioner to Bangladesh.

Early life and education
Doraiswami was born to a Tamil military family. His father was an airforce officer who fought in the Bangladesh Liberation war, a country to which Doraiswamy eventually became High Commissioner. He studied in schools all over India before eventually acquiring a master's degree in history from the University of Delhi. He worked for a year as a journalist while sitting for the Civil Services exam.

Professional career
He joined the Indian Foreign Service as part of the 1992 batch. In the course of his diplomatic career, he has been posted to the permanent mission to the UN, was the consul general in Johannesburg, and headed the Division for the South Asian Association for Regional Cooperation and the North American division at the Ministry of External Affairs. He has served as High Commissioner of India to Bangladesh, and as Ambassador of India to South Korea and Uzbekistan. He was also deputed to the Prime Ministers office during the tenure of Prime Minister Atal Bihari Vajpayee and was Private secretary to Prime Minister Dr Manmohan Singh.

Personal life
He is married to Sangeeta Doraiswamy and they have one son. 
Vikram Doraiswami's interests include reading, sports, fitness, travel and  Jazz. He speaks Chinese, some French and Korean.

References

External links
MEET THE ENVOY: INDIAN HIGH COMMISSIONER | DBC NEWS

High Commissioners of India to Bangladesh
Living people
1969 births